It has been suggested that the origin of cricket can be traced back to Flemish emigrants residing in the south of England since the medieval period. 
The game was first played in the sheep-rearing country of the south-east, where the short grass of the fields made it possible to bowl a ball of wool at a target. That target was usually the wicket-gate of the sheep pasture, which was defended with a bat in the form of a shepherd’s crooked staff. 

The origin of the word cricket could derive from the Flemish word kricke or krickje, which means a low chair or stool. A cric, crick, cricke in Old Flemish meant a piece of wood shaped in a T or a small chair. To hit a ball with a crooked piece of would be called met de krikke ketsen, which could indeed have been a shepherd’s staff.

The earliest definite reference to cricket is dated Monday, 17 January 1597 (i.e., an "Old Style" Julian date which is 27 January 1598 by modern reckoning under the Gregorian calendar). It is a deposition in the records of a legal case at Guildford, Surrey, regarding usage of a parcel of land. John Derrick, a coroner, testified that he had played cricket on the land when he was a boy in about 1550. Derrick's testimony is confirmation that the sport was being played by the middle of the 16th century, but its true origin is unknown. All that can be said with a fair degree of certainty is that its beginning was earlier than 1550, probably somewhere in south-east England within the counties of Kent, Sussex and Surrey. Unlike other games with batsmen, bowlers and fielders, such as stoolball and rounders, cricket can only be played on relatively short grass, especially as the ball was delivered along the ground until the 1760s. Forest clearings and land where sheep had grazed would have been suitable places to play.

The sparse information available about the early years suggests that it may have been a children's game in the 16th century but, by 1611, it had become an adult pastime. The earliest known organised match was played in about 1611, a year in which other significant references to the sport are dated. From 1611 to 1725, fewer than thirty matches are known to have been organised between recognised teams. Similarly, only a limited number of players, teams and venues of the period have been recorded. The earliest matches played by English parish teams are examples of village cricket. Although village matches are now considered minor in status, the early matches are significant in cricket's history simply because they are known. There were no newspaper reports of matches until the end of the seventeenth century and so the primary sources are court records and private diaries, hence games were rarely recorded.

During the reign of Charles I, the gentry took an increased interest as patrons and occasionally as players. A big attraction for them was the opportunity that the game offered for gambling and this escalated in the years following the Restoration when cricket in London and the south-eastern counties of England evolved into a popular social activity. The patrons staged lucrative eleven-a-side matches featuring the earliest professional players. Meanwhile, English colonists had introduced cricket to North America and the West Indies, and the sailors and traders of the East India Company had taken it to the Indian subcontinent.

In the first quarter of the 18th century, more information about cricket became available as the growing newspaper industry took an interest. The sport noticeably began to spread throughout England as the century went on. By 1725, significant patrons—such as Edwin Stead; Charles Lennox, 2nd Duke of Richmond; and Sir William Gage—were forming teams of county strength in Kent and Sussex. The earliest-known great players, including William Bedle and Thomas Waymark, were active. Cricket was attracting large, vociferous crowds and the matches were social occasions at which gambling and alcoholic drinks were additional attractions.

Origins of cricket as a children's game

The most widely accepted theory about the origin of cricket is that it first developed in early medieval times to the south and south-east of London in the geographical areas of the North Downs, the South Downs and the Weald. The counties of Kent, Sussex and Surrey were therefore the earliest centres of excellence and it was from here that the game reached London, where its lasting popularity was ensured, and other southern counties like Berkshire, Essex, Hampshire and Middlesex. As early as c.1611, a cricket match was recorded at Chevening in Kent between teams representing the Downs and the Weald.

A number of words in common use at the time are thought to be possible sources for cricket's name. In the earliest known reference to the sport in 1597, it is called creckett. Given the strong medieval trade connections between south-east England and the County of Flanders when the latter belonged to the Duchy of Burgundy, the name may have been derived from the Middle Dutch krick(-e), meaning a stick; or the Old English cricc or cryce meaning a crutch or staff. In what may be an early reference to the sport, a 1533 poem attributed to John Skelton describes Flemish weavers as "kings of crekettes", a word of apparent Middle Dutch origin. In Samuel Johnson's Dictionary of the English Language (1755), he derived cricket from "cryce, Saxon, a stick". In Old French, the word criquet seems to have meant a kind of club or stick, though this may have been the origin of croquet. The first mention of criquet in France is in a letter of grievance to King Louis XI on 11 October 1478, following a riot in Liettres. Another possible source is the Middle Dutch word krickstoel, meaning a long low stool used for kneeling in church, the shape of which resembled the two stump wicket used in early cricket. According to Heiner Gillmeister, a European language expert of the University of Bonn, cricket derives from the Middle Dutch phrase for hockey, met de (krik ket)sen (i.e., "with the stick chase").

Cricket was probably devised by children and survived for many generations as essentially a children's game. The invention of the game could have happened in Norman or Plantagenet times anytime before 1300; or even in Saxon times before 1066.

All acknowledged subject experts and authorities agree that there is no evidence of cricket having evolved from another bat-and-ball sport and, equally, no evidence that any other bat-and-ball sport evolved from cricket. The authorities include writers Harry Altham, John Arlott, Derek Birley, Arthur Haygarth, David Underdown, Roy Webber and Peter Wynne-Thomas. Their consensus view is that the only thing that can definitely be said about the origin of cricket is that its earliest record is in a late 16th-century court case in Surrey which proves it was played by children in southeast England in the middle of that century. There have been alternative theories of origin but these have been dismissed or ignored by authorities. For example, the writer Andrew Lang claimed in 1912 that cricket evolved from a bat-and-ball game which may have been played in Dál Riata as early as the 6th century and this claim has been dismissed, by Anthony Bateman among others, in terms of "Lang's idiosyncratic belief in the Celtic origin of cricket". It is true that cricket is one of many bat-and-ball sports existing worldwide which have no known origin. Others are the definitely Celtic sports of hurling and shinty. Golf and hockey are other British ball games involving a club or stick while croquet was apparently imported from France and globally there are games such as Sweden's brännboll, Italy's lippa, India's gilli-danda, Finland's pesäpallo and Samoa's kilikiti. However, it is generally believed that cricket essentially belongs to the same family of bat-and-ball games as stoolball, rounders and baseball but whether it evolved from any of these, or vice versa, cannot be determined. There is a 1523 reference to stoolball at a designated field in Oxfordshire; this may then have been a generic term for any game in which a ball is somehow hit with a bat or stick. 18th century references to stoolball in conjunction with cricket clearly indicate that it was a separate activity.

"Creag"
On Thursday, 10 March 1300 (Julian calendar), wardrobe accounts of King Edward I of England included refunds to one John de Leek of monies that he had paid out to enable Prince Edward to play "creag and other games" at both Westminster and Newenden. Prince Edward, the future Prince of Wales, was then aged 15. It has been suggested that creag was an early form of cricket, but it could have been something quite different. Creag is possibly an early spelling of the word craic here taken as an Irish word meaning fun, entertainment, or enjoyable conversation. This sense of the word crack is found in Irish English, Scottish English, and Geordie in North East England. In Ireland the spelling craic is now more common than crack.

Earliest definite references

The earliest definite reference to cricket being played anywhere in England (and hence anywhere in the world) is in evidence given at a 1597 legal case, concerning ownership of a parcel of land, which confirms that it was played on common land in Guildford, Surrey, around 1550. The court in Guildford heard on Monday, 17 January 1597 (Julian date, equating to 27 January 1598 in the Gregorian calendar) from a 59-year-old coroner, John Derrick, who gave witness that when he was a scholar fifty years earlier at the Free School of Guildford, "hee and diverse of his fellows did runne and play [on the common land] at creckett and other plaies", confirming that the sport was played there by schoolboys c.1550. It is perhaps significant that cricket is the only one of the plaies to be specifically named.

In 1598, there was a reference to cricket in an Italian-English dictionary by Giovanni Florio. His definition of the word  was: "to make a noise as a cricket, to play cricket-a-wicket, and be merry". Florio is the first writer known to have defined cricket in terms of both an insect and a game.

The development of village cricket: 1611–1660

Beginning of adult participation

The first definite mention of cricket in Kent is deduced from a 1640 court case which recorded a "cricketing" of the Weald and the Upland versus the Chalk Hill at Chevening "about thirty years since" (around 1610). This is the earliest known village cricket match; and the earliest known organised match in Kent, in England and in the world. Inter-parish contests became popular in the first half of the 17th century. As with the 1597 reference, the case concerned the land on which the game was played.

In 1611, a French-English dictionary was published by Randle Cotgrave who defined the noun crosse as "the crooked staff wherewith boys play at cricket"; the verb form of the word is crosser, defined as "to play at cricket". Although cricket was defined as a boys' game in Cotgrave's dictionary, as per the Guildford schoolboys above, other references from this time indicate adult participation. The first is in a 1613 court case which recorded that someone was assaulted with a "cricket staffe" at Wanborough, near Guildford. In 1616, John Bullokar referred to cricket in his An English Expositor as "a kind of game with a ball". In 1617, the 18-year-old Oliver Cromwell is recorded as playing cricket and football in London. This is the earliest definite reference to cricket in London.

In 1624, a fatality occurred following a match on Saturday, 28 August, at Horsted Keynes in Sussex. A fielder called Jasper Vinall was struck on the head by the batsman, Edward Tye, who was trying to hit the ball a second time to avoid being caught. Vinall, who died thirteen days later at home in West Hoathly, is thus the earliest recorded cricketing fatality. The matter was recorded in a coroner's court, which returned a verdict of death by misadventure. The tragedy was repeated in 1647 when another fatality was recorded at Selsey, now in West Sussex, a player called Henry Brand being hit on the head by a batsman trying to hit the ball a second time. When the first Laws of Cricket were encoded in 1744, it was illegal to hit the ball twice and a batsman breaking the rule was to be given out. The record of the 1624 case confirms that two villages, Horsted Keynes and West Hoathly, were involved in the match and provides further evidence of the growth of village cricket.

Breaking the Sabbath
The first definite mention of cricket in Sussex was in 1611 and relates to ecclesiastical court records stating that two parishioners of Sidlesham, Bartholomew Wyatt and Richard Latter, had failed to attend church on Easter Sunday because they were playing cricket. They were fined 12 pence each and made to do penance, which meant confessing their guilt to the whole church congregation the following Sunday.

The Sidlesham case is the first of several 17th century cricket references, until the Restoration in 1660, arising from Puritan disapproval of recreational activity, especially on Sundays. Puritan interference had become enough of a problem by 1617 for James I to issue the Declaration of Sports (also known as The Book of Sports) which listed the sports and recreations that were permitted on Sundays. Cricket is not mentioned. Initially, the declaration was effective in Lancashire only, partly as a reaction to Puritan suppression there of certain activities which were pursued by the Roman Catholic gentry. In 1618, the declaration was issued nationally and then reissued by Charles I in 1633. Sunday amusements were strongly opposed by the Puritans.

The declaration had limited success until the Civil War began in 1642. The Puritans were by then in control of Parliament which closed the theatres and issued sanctions against other recreational activities although, again, there was no mention of cricket except when individual players were accused of "breaking the Sabbath". The Declaration of Sports manuscript was publicly burned by order of the Puritan Parliament in 1643.

In 1622, several parishioners of Boxgrove, near Chichester, were prosecuted for playing cricket in a churchyard on Sunday, 5 May. There were three reasons for the prosecution: one was that it contravened a local bye-law; another reflected concern about church windows which may or may not have been broken; the third was that a little childe had like to have her braines beaten out with a cricket batt! The latter reason was because the rules at the time allowed the batsman to hit the ball twice and so fielding near the batsman was very hazardous, as the incidents involving Jasper Vinall and Henry Brand would drastically confirm. In 1628, an ecclesiastical case related to a game at East Lavant, also near Chichester, being played on a Sunday. One of the defendants argued that he had not played during evening prayer time but only before and after. It did him no good as he was fined the statutory 12 pence and ordered to do penance.

There are three further references before the Civil War. In a 1636 court case concerning a tithe dispute, a witness called Henry Mabbinck testified that he played cricket "in the Parke" at West Horsley in Surrey. Another ecclesiastical case recorded parishioners of Midhurst, Sussex, playing cricket during evening prayer on Sunday, 26 February 1637 (i.e., Julian date). In 1640, Puritan clerics at both Maidstone and Harbledown, near Canterbury, denounced cricket as "profane", especially if played on Sunday.

When the English Civil War began in 1642, the Long Parliament banned theatres, as they had met with Puritan disapproval. Although similar action would be taken against certain sports, there is no evidence of cricket being prohibited. Except that players must not "break the Sabbath", references to the game before and during the Commonwealth suggest that it was approved; and Cromwell himself had been a player as a young man.

In 1654, three men were prosecuted at Eltham in Kent for playing cricket on a Sunday. As the Puritans were now firmly in power, Cromwell's Protectorate having been established the previous year, the penalty was doubled to 24 pence (two shillings). The defendants were charged with "breaking the Sabbath", not with playing cricket. Similarly, when Cromwell's commissioners banned sport in Ireland two years later on the grounds of "unlawful assembly", there is no evidence that the ban included cricket, which had probably not reached Ireland by that time.

Puritan prejudice did not survive the Restoration. In 1671, a man called Edward Bound was charged with playing cricket on the Sabbath and was exonerated: evidence that attitudes had changed. The case was reported in Shere, Surrey.

The beginning of amateur cricket
The beginnings of cricket's social division between amateurs and professionals, from which the annual Gentlemen v Players contest ultimately evolved, can be traced to the reign of Charles I. In 1629, Henry Cuffin, a curate at Ruckinge in Kent, was prosecuted by an archdeacon's court for playing cricket on Sunday evening after prayers. He claimed that several of his fellow players were "persons of repute and fashion". This statement is the first evidence of cricket achieving popularity among the gentry.

It was the gentry who introduced large-scale gambling into cricket and some of these gamblers subsequently became patrons by forming select teams that would improve their chances of winning. During the Commonwealth, gambling was, of political necessity, low key. The earliest reference to gambling on a cricket match is in the records of a 1646 court case concerning non-payment of a wager that was made on a game at Coxheath in Kent on Friday, 29 May that year. Curiously, considering the huge sums of money staked later in the century, this wager was for twelve candles, but the participants included members of the local gentry. The match at Coxheath is the earliest known example of an "odds" game as two Coxheath players were against four Maidstone players; the Coxheath two won. It was possibly a single wicket match and, if that could be proved, it would be the earliest on record.

In 1652, a case at Cranbrook against John Rabson, Esq. and others referred to "a certain unlawful game called cricket". Rabson was evidently a member of the gentry but the other defendants were all working class. Cricket has long been recognised as a sport that bridged the class divide but, in time, the cricketing gentlemen came to be called "amateurs" to emphasise the distinction between themselves and the professionals who belonged to the lower social classes, mostly to the working class. The amateur became not merely someone who played cricket in his spare time but a particular type of top-class cricketer who existed officially until 1962, when the distinction between amateur and professional was abolished and all the then first-class players became nominally professional. In terms of remuneration, amateurs claimed expenses for playing while professionals were paid a salary or fee. Amateur cricket was an extension of the game played in schools, universities and other centres of education, both as a curricular and extracurricular activity. The schools and universities formed the "production line" that created nearly all the top-class amateur players.

There are few 17th century references to cricket being played at or in the vicinity of schools but, in 1647, a Latin poem contains a probable reference to cricket being played at Winchester College; if so, it is the earliest known mention of cricket in Hampshire. There is a reference to the game at St Paul's School, London c.1665 concerning John Churchill, 1st Duke of Marlborough, who studied there. In his Social History of English Cricket, Derek Birley comments that school cricket was "alive and well during the interregnum" (1649–1660). He speculates that the game "must have been known to every schoolboy in the south-east" of England. He doubts, however, that the sport at this time was part of any school's curriculum. Apart from Eton College and Westminster School, all schools in the 17th century had local intakes and no class segregation. Therefore, the sons of rich and poor families played together. As evidenced by the legal cases of 1646 and 1652, described above, cricket was played jointly by gentry and workers.

The earliest reference to cricket at Oxford University is dated 1673. In John Phillips' Duellum Musicum, a 1673 pamphlet concerning music tuition, there is a criticism of his rival Thomas Salmon, who had boasted of being a graduate of Trinity College, Oxford: "He shews but a slender sign of his University-Education: Where he seems to have spent his time rather in the more laudable Exercises of Trap and Cricket, than in any sound Reading".

Depending on when Salmon graduated, it would seem that cricket was a normal activity at Oxford for some time before Phillips wrote his pamphlet. It was certainly well established at Oxford by October 1728 when the 19-year-old Samuel Johnson entered Pembroke College. He told James Boswell that cricket matches were played during the one year he was at Oxford and this was recorded by Boswell in his Life of Samuel Johnson. A comment by Horace Walpole confirms that cricket was being played at Eton during the first quarter of the 18th century. The earliest reference to cricket being played at Cambridge University is dated 1710 and both of those establishments were attended by William Goldwin who, in 1706, wrote a Latin poem of 95 lines on a rural cricket match. It was called In Certamen Pilae (On a Ball Game) and it was published in his Musae Juveniles.

Development of important cricket: 1660–1700
It was during the second half of the 17th century that, as Roy Webber put it, "the game took a real grip" especially in the south-eastern counties. The nobility withdrew to their country estates during the Commonwealth and were involved in village cricket as a pastime which, after the Commonwealth expired in 1660, they took with them when they returned to London. Even so, there is a shortage of references from this period due to the Licensing of the Press Act 1662 which imposed stringent controls on the newspaper industry and sports, including cricket, were not reported. The few surviving references have been found in official records, such as court cases, or in private letters and diaries. In May 1666, Sir Robert Paston, a resident of Richmond, wrote a letter to his wife and mentioned that their son had taken part in "a game of criquett (sic) on Richmond Green" which is the first reference to cricket at Richmond Green, a popular venue for matches during the 17th and 18th centuries.

The Restoration of the monarchy in England in 1660 was immediately followed by the reopening of the theatres and sanctions imposed by the Puritans on sports were also lifted. According to Rowland Bowen, "it is likely that the Restoration was the crucial factor in leading to the social acceptance of the game". Although there are only scattered references to the game in the time of Charles II, it is clear that its popularity was increasing and that it was expanding.

The Restoration was effectively completed during the spring of 1660 and, in the general euphoria which both accompanied and followed these historic events, gambling on cricket and other sports was freely pursued. The nobility adopted cricket as one of their main sports along with horse racing and prizefighting. Under their patronage, the first teams representing several parishes and even whole counties were formed in the 1660s and the period saw the first "great matches" as cricket evolved into a major sport. A significant aspect of this evolution was the introduction of professionalism as the nobility returned to London after the Restoration. They were keen to develop cricket and brought with them some of the "local experts" from village cricket whom they now employed as professional players.

H. S. Altham asserted that, within a year or two of the Restoration, "it became the thing in London society to make matches and form clubs". He claimed that a kind of "feudal patronage" was established as the nobility took control of the sport, their interest fuelled by the opportunities for gambling that it provided, and this set the pattern for cricket's development through the next century. These claims by Altham are challenged by John Major who wrote that he could find no evidence at all of matches in London before the 1700s and no mention of any club prior to 1722.

The Gaming Act 1664 was passed by the Cavalier Parliament to try to curb some of the post-Restoration excesses, including gambling on cricket, and it limited stakes to £100. That was equivalent to about £ in present-day terms. It is known that cricket could attract stakes of 50 guineas by 1697 and it was funded by gambling throughout the next century.

There was a significant development at Maidstone on Saturday, 28 March 1668 when the quarter sessions made a ruling that customs and excise could not claim excise duty on alcoholic drinks sold at a "kricketing"; it was further ruled that a match promoter had the right to sell ale to spectators, presumably after obtaining the necessary licence. As John Major suggested, this dealt a massive blow to "Puritan morality", and it could have been the beginning of the long-term relationship between sport and alcohol. Derek Birley's comment on the excise ruling was that cricket's "connection with public houses is historic in every sense of the word". In his view, the sport had "arrived" because the brewery trade was the earliest and strongest sponsor of popular sport.

In 1677, accounts of Thomas Lennard, 1st Earl of Sussex, include an item which refers to £3 being paid to him when he went to a cricket match being played at "ye Dicker", which was a common near Herstmonceux in East Sussex. In 1678, there was mention of cricket as "a play" (presumably in the sense of a sport that is played) in a Latin dictionary published by Dr Adam Littleton. In 1694, accounts of Sir John Pelham record 2s 6d paid for a wager concerning a cricket match at Lewes.

It has been claimed that Mitcham Cricket Club was formed in 1685, the club playing on what is today known as Mitcham Cricket Green. The site has hosted cricket matches ever since. While Mitcham is believed by some to be the world's oldest cricket club, there is no evidence of any club being founded before 1722. Croydon, Dartford and London may all been founded by the 1720s but no dates of origin have been found, although there was an actual reference to a London Club in 1722. John Major and his team of researchers could find no evidence for any club prior to 1722. Major mentions Mitcham as one of several localities in which impromptu games were thriving on common land. The others were Chelsea, Kennington, Clapham, Walworth and the Weald.

London Cricket Club was to become chiefly associated with the Artillery Ground in Finsbury. This venue was first mentioned re cricket on Friday, 7 May 1725, when the minutes of the Honourable Artillery Company referred to its being used for cricket: there is a note which concerns "the abuse done to the herbage of the ground by the cricket players". The Artillery Ground became the feature venue for cricket in the mid-18th century.

In 1695, Parliament decided against a renewal of the 1662 Licensing Act and so cleared the way for a free press on the Act's expiry in 1696. Censorship had already been relaxed following the Bill of Rights 1689. It was from this time that cricket matters could be reported in the newspapers, but it would be a very long time before the newspaper industry adapted sufficiently to provide frequent, let alone comprehensive, reports. The earliest known newspaper report of a "great match" was in the Foreign Post dated Wednesday, 7 July 1697:

"The middle of last week (i.e., probably on Wednesday, 30 June 1697) a great match at cricket was played in Sussex; there were eleven of a side, and they played for fifty guineas apiece".

The match has been recorded by more than one source, starting with G. B. Buckley who said it is the earliest record of an eleven-a-side match. The stakes on offer confirm the importance of the fixture and the fact that it was eleven-a-side suggests that two strong and well-balanced teams were assembled. Following the decision of the English government in 1695 to allow freedom of the press (i.e., they decided not to renew the Licensing of the Press Act 1662 which had inhibited the scope of publications), it was possible for sporting events to be reported; but, as John Major says, reports in the early newspapers were sparse, although trivia tended to make good copy and large wagers between rival patrons were given coverage.

Periodicals called The Post Boy and The Post Man were in circulation during the early 18th century. In 1700, a series of ten-a-side matches to be held on Clapham Common, near Vauxhall, was pre-announced on Saturday, 30 March, by The Post Boy. The first was to take place on Easter Monday, 1 April, and prizes of £10 and £20 were at stake. No match reports could be found so the results and scores remain unknown. The advert says the teams would consist of ten "Gentlemen" per side but the invitation to attend was to "Gentlemen and others". This clearly implies that cricket had achieved both the patronage that underwrote it through the 18th century and the spectators who demonstrated its lasting popular appeal. As the event involved "gentlemen only", it was probably minor in quality but is nevertheless the earliest known organised match in the county of Surrey.

Rules and equipment of early cricket
Early cricketers played in their everyday clothes and had no protective equipment such as gloves or pads. A 1743 painting of a game in progress at the Artillery Ground depicts two batsmen and a bowler dressed alike in white shirt, breeches, white knee-length stockings and shoes with buckles. The wicket-keeper wears the same clothes with the addition of a waistcoat. An umpire and scorer wear three-quarter length coats and tricorn hats. Apart from the shirts and stockings, none of the clothes are white and no one wears pads or gloves. The ball is bowled underarm along the ground, as in bowls, at varying speed towards a wicket consisting of two stumps mounted by a single crosspiece. The batsman addresses the delivery with a bat that resembles a modern hockey stick, this shape being ideal for dealing with a ball on the ground. The modern straight bat is said to have evolved in the 1760s after the introduction of the pitched delivery.

The record of the 1622 case at Boxgrove contains the earliest reference to the cricket bat. The term "batt" in cricket was peculiar to Kent and Sussex, where coastal smugglers were known as "batmen" because of the cudgels they carried. The earliest reference to a "flat-faced" bat (i.e., with a flat surface at the bottom of the stick in ice hockey style) also occurs in 1622. The term "bat" remained comparatively rare until about 1720. The terms in more general use were "staff", "stave" or "stick". These tended to have regional usage: for example, "stave" was used in the Gloucester area and "batt" in the south-east; while "staff" and especially "stick" were more widely used. "Bat" is derived from the French "battledore", shaped like a table tennis bat, which was used by washerwomen to beat their washing with.

The earliest reference to the cricket ball is found in 1658 in Mysteries of Love and Eloquence by Edward Phillips. The pitch has been 22 yards long (i.e., a chain) since the first known code of Laws in 1744 and it is believed this length had been in use since the introduction of Gunter's chain in 1620. The over consisted of four deliveries until the 19th century.

The earliest known reference to the wicket is contained in lines written in an old bible in 1680 which invited "All you that do delight in Cricket, come to Marden, pitch your wickets". Marden is in West Sussex, north of Chichester, and close to Hambledon, which is just across the county boundary in Hampshire. The wicket until the 1770s comprised two stumps and a single bail. By that time, the shape of the wicket was high and narrow after the 1744 Laws defined the dimensions as 22 inches high and six inches wide. But earlier 18th century pictures show a wicket that was low and broad, perhaps two feet wide by one foot high. The ends of the stumps were forked to support the light bail and there were criteria for the firmness of pitching the stumps into the ground and for the delicate placing of the bail so that it would easily topple when a stump was hit.

There has been a lot of conjecture about the origin of the wicket, but suffice to say that the 17th century outline shape is more akin to the profile of a church stool, which is low and broad. Furthermore, the legs of the stool were called stumps, which adds further credence to the idea that stools were used as early wickets. According to the Churchwarden's Accounts for Great St. Mary's Church of Cambridge (1504–1635), a church stool was sometimes known in the south-east by the Dutch name of "kreckett", this being the same word used for the game by John Derrick in 1597.

The earliest known mention of the umpire dates from 1680 and is the first entry in Buckley's Fresh Light on 18th Century Cricket. Buckley does not quote the reference "that is quite unfit for publication nowadays" but he confirms a clear reference to "the two umpires" and that the double wicket form of the game was already well known in London. It is also the first mention of cricket in the county of Middlesex.

There were two main forms of cricket in the 17th and 18th centuries. One was single wicket in which, as the name implies, there is only one batsman, although teams of threes or fives often took part. The converse is the "double wicket" form, with two batsmen, and this has long been associated with eleven-a-side teams playing two innings each and it is these games which, depending on the teams involved, have important match status. Although single wicket was in vogue through the period of this history, the earliest definite record of a single wicket match is in 1726, so it is out of scope in this article.

In early cricket, there were two umpires as now, but the modern square-leg umpire stood close to the striker's wicket. Both umpires carried a bat which the running batsman was required to touch in order to complete his run. There were two scorers who sat on the field and recorded the scores by making notches on tallysticks; runs were then known as notches for this reason.

English cricket in the early 18th century

Patrons

On an unknown date in 1702, the 1st Duke of Richmond's XI defeated an Arundel XI at an unspecified venue in Sussex. The source for this game is a receipt sent by one Saul Bradley to the Duke on Monday, 14 December 1702. The receipt was for one shilling and six pence paid by the Duke "for brandy when your Grace plaid at Cricket with Arundel men". It is thought the brandy was bought to celebrate a victory. The venue was probably either Goodwood, where Richmond had his estate, or Arundel, possibly on Bury Hill which was used for cricket in later years. Arundel was a prominent centre of cricket in the 18th century.

After the 1st Duke of Richmond died in 1723, his son Charles Lennox, 2nd Duke of Richmond, quickly succeeded him as cricket's main benefactor and became a famous patron of Sussex cricket for the next thirty years. The 2nd Duke enjoyed a friendly rivalry with his friend Sir William Gage, another Sussex patron. Their teams played each other many times and their earliest known contest was on Tuesday, 20 July 1725, five days after Sir William's team was beaten by unknown opponents. Richmond wrote to Gage in early July 1725 and issued a challenge for a match to be played at Goodwood. Gage replied to him by letter on 16 July and confirmed that his team would play the Duke's on Tuesday, 20 July. Gage then stated that he is "in great affliction from being shamefully beaten yesterday (Thursday, 15 July 1725) the first match I played ys (sic) year". He went on to wish the Duke success in everything except his cricket match. The game on 20 July was actually played at Bury Hill, Arundel and Richmond's team won by "above forty (runs)". The report in the Daily Journal newspaper on Wednesday, 21 July, confirms Bury Hill (then called Berry Hill), near Arundel, as the venue. The match, played before "a vast Concourse of People", was hosted by Thomas Howard, 8th Duke of Norfolk who gave a ball at Arundel Castle in the evening.

The main rival to Richmond and Gage was Edwin Stead of Maidstone, who was the first of the noted Kent patrons. The Sussex teams of Richmond and Gage enjoyed an inter-county rivalry with Stead's Kent that could have originated the concept of the County Championship.

The terms of the wager
The patrons ensured that cricket was financed in the 18th century but their interest, equally applicable to horse racing and prizefighting, was based on the opportunities that cricket provided for gambling. Every important match in the 18th century, whether eleven-a-side or single wicket, was played for stakes. The early newspapers recognised this and were more interested in publishing the odds than the match scores. Reports would say who won the wager rather than who won the match.

Sometimes, gambling would lead to dispute and two matches ended up in court when rival interests sought legal rulings on the terms of their wagers. On Monday, 1 September 1718, a game on White Conduit Fields in Islington between London and the Rochester Punch Club was unfinished because three Rochester players "made an elopement" in an attempt to have the game declared incomplete so that they would retain their stake money. London was clearly winning at the time. The London players sued for their winnings and the game while incomplete was the subject of a noted lawsuit in which the terms of the wager were at issue. The court ordered that the match must be "played out" and this happened in early July 1719 (the exact date is uncertain but it was before the 4th). Rochester with four wickets standing needed thirty more runs to win but were all out for 9. It is not certain if 30 was their overall target or if they needed thirty more in addition to runs scored in the original encounter; equally, it is not known if 9 was the innings total they achieved or if they added nine more to their "overnight" score. London's 21-run victory is the earliest known definite result of any cricket match. The match is the earliest known mention of White Conduit Fields as a venue.

In 1724 (exact date unknown), Edwin Stead's XI v Chingford ended early because the Chingford team refused to play to a finish when Stead's team held the advantage. Another court case followed. It is known that Lord Chief Justice Pratt presided over the case and ordered them, as in the London v Rochester match in 1718, to play it out so that all wagers could be fulfilled. Pratt "referr'd the said Cause back to Dartford Heath, to be played on where they left off, and a Rule of Court was made accordingly". The game was completed in 1726 but the final result is not on record, and there is no confirmation that Stead's team held their advantage and won.

The introduction of articles of agreement, agreed before matches by the stakeholders, largely resolved any problems between patrons and match organisers. The concept was more important in terms of defining the rules of play and eventually these were codified as the Laws of Cricket.

Matches of the early 18th century
On Tuesday, 24 July 1705, The Post Man announced West of Kent v Chatham, an 11-a-side game to be played in Kent on Tuesday, 7 August. The primary source gives the venue as "Maulden" which almost certainly refers to Town Malling. There were several matches throughout the 18th century involving teams called "West Kent" and "East Kent". Chatham was a prominent centre of cricket in the 18th century.

On Thursday, 26 June 1707, there was a London v Mitcham match at Lamb's Conduit Field, Holborn. The result is unknown. This is the earliest known important match in Middlesex and possibly the earliest known to involve the original London Cricket Club, though the date of the club's formation is uncertain and the team here might have been an ad hoc London XI. In a similar vein to the "all England" term used later in the century, the source calls this team "all London". The Mitcham team may have represented the extant Mitcham Cricket Club, which has a claimed foundation date of 1685.

On Tuesday, 1 and Tuesday, 8 July 1707, Croydon played London twice, the first game played in Croydon, probably at Duppas Hill, and the second at Lamb's Conduit Field in Holborn. Both matches were advertised by The Post Man as "two great matches at cricket (to be) plaid, between London and Croydon; the first at Croydon on Tuesday, 1 July, and the other to be plaid in Lamb's-Conduit-Fields, near Holborn, on the Tuesday following, being the 3rd (sic) of July". No post-match reports could be found so the results and scores are unknown. The match in Croydon is the earliest known important match in Surrey. As with the previous match, it is not known if the teams at this time represented formally constituted clubs and it is possible that both were ad hoc teams drawn from local residents. Croydon and London both had important teams in the first half of the 18th century. The match in Holborn was a return to the one on 1 July. There has been some confusion about the date of the second match following a misreading of the original source by H. T. Waghorn, who was the first modern researcher, but Tuesday, 8 July is believed to be correct.

On Wednesday, 23 June 1708, a local match took place somewhere in the Canterbury area and was recorded in the diary of one Thomas Minter, a Canterbury resident, who wrote: "We beat Ash Street at Crickets (sic)". Although this was probably a minor match only, it illustrates the popularity of cricket in Kent.

The earliest known match that definitely involved county teams, or teams using the names of counties, was Kent v Surrey at Dartford Brent on Wednesday, 29 June 1709. This was advertised in the Post Man the previous Saturday and played for a stake of £50. From this time, there are references to counties in use as team names although it is generally believed that the earliest "inter-county matches" were really inter-parish matches involving two villages on either side of a county boundary. Dartford was an important club in the first half of the 18th century and the match is the earliest known mention of Dartford Brent as a venue.

One player who could have taken part in the 1709 match was William Bedle (1680–1768), of Dartford, who is the earliest great player whose name has been recorded. He was "reckoned to be the most expert player in England" and must have been in his prime c.1700 to c.1725. Other good players known to have been active in the 1720s were Edwin Stead of Kent; Edmund Chapman and Stephen Dingate of Surrey; Tim Coleman of London; and Thomas Waymark of Sussex.

Village cricket continued to thrive in the 18th century. On Friday, 31 May 1717, Thomas Marchant, a farmer from Hurstpierpoint in Sussex, first mentioned cricket in his diary. He made numerous references to the game, particularly concerning his local club, until 1727. His son Will played for "our parish", as he often called the Hurstpierpoint team. In total, his diaries mention 21 village matches and the entries provide evidence of the widespread popularity of cricket in Sussex. It is from the 1717 season that a continuous history of English cricket by season is possible. Records of cricket have survived from every season after 1716, although the details in most seasons through the 18th century remain sparse.

Dartford v London
The first great rivalry in cricket history was between the Dartford and London clubs who are first known to have played each other in 1722. London played some matches against Kent but the county side is believed to have largely consisted of Dartford players. On Wednesday, 19 August 1719, London v Kent was played at White Conduit Fields and Kent won. The report said the teams played for "a considerable sum of money". There is an insight into the priorities of early 18th century cricketers as the contemporary report concludes with: "The Kentish men won the wager" (i.e., the wager was more important than the match).

On Saturday, 9 July 1720, London v Kent at White Conduit Fields was won by London. In this match, two London fielders were badly injured by a clash of heads. H. T. Waghorn noted a lull in the advertising and reporting of cricket after this game and he wondered if that was due to a perception of the sport as dangerous. If there was a lapse in cricket at this time, the more likely causes would be either: (a) the South Sea Bubble which ruined many investors and so could have reduced cricket patronage; or (b), as Waghorn himself mentions, "the (news)papers were small, and space limited, the advertising and reporting (of) matches ceased". The South Sea Bubble may have had an economic impact on investment and gambling as, when the South Sea Company was found to be insolvent, its crash in 1720 caused massive repercussions throughout the economy and many formerly prosperous investors were ruined. A potential impact on reporting was the Stamp Act 1712 which applied stamp duty to newspapers and so increased their publication costs. This in turn caused publishers to reduce paper size with limited space for content.

On Wednesday, 18 July 1722, London v Dartford was the subject of a letter in The Weekly Journal dated Saturday, 21 July 1722. It is believed the match took place somewhere in the Islington area, so the exact venue may have been White Conduit Fields. The match was abandoned following a dispute. The letter said: "A Match at Cricket was made between the little Parish of Dartford in Kent, and the Gentlemen known by the name of the London Club". Teams styled "London" were already in existence, as above, but this is the first actual reference to a "London Club".

Dartford and London met at Dartford Brent on Thursday, 11 June 1724 and, one week later, a return game was the earliest known match at Kennington Common, near where The Oval is now sited. The results of both matches are unknown.

Other matches in the 1720s
On Wednesday, 6 July 1720, Kingston v Richmond was played at an unknown venue and Kingston won. The secondary source is uncertain about the date due to a slight ambiguity in the primary source, a contemporary newspaper published Saturday, 16 July, which refers to "Wednesday last". The date of the match must therefore be either 6 or 13 July. The source says 5 or 12 July but this is an error as those dates were Tuesdays.

There was a Surrey v London match at Moulsey Hurst on an unknown date in 1723. The result is unknown. The source states that "XI Gentlemen of Surrey played XI of London at Moulsey Hurst during the summer". It is the earliest known mention of Moulsey Hurst as a venue for cricket.

In 1723, the prominent Tory politician Robert Harley, Earl of Oxford recorded in his journal: "At Dartford upon the Heath as we came out of the town, the men of Tonbridge and the Dartford men were warmly engaged at the sport of cricket, which of all the people of England the Kentish folk are the most renowned for, and of all the Kentish men, the men of Dartford lay claim to the greatest excellence". It is more than likely to have been Dartford Brent where this game was taking place.

On Monday, 10 August 1724, there was a match at Penshurst Park (result unknown) which featured the combined parishes of Penshurst, Tonbridge & Wadhurst versus Dartford. This was recorded in a diary entry by one John Dawson, who may have watched it. No details are known but Mr Dawson says it was "a great cricket match". Some sources have mistakenly given the venue as Islington but contemporary newspapers confirm that it took place at Penshurst Park.

The growth of cricket in England and overseas
The earliest known mention of cricket being played outside England is dated Saturday, 6 May 1676. A diarist called Henry Tonge, who was part of a British mission at Aleppo in the Ottoman Empire, recorded that "at least forty of the English" left the city for recreational purposes and, having found a nice place to pitch a tent for dinner, they "had several pastimes and sports" including "krickett". At six they "returned home in good order".

The first definite references to cricket in India and North America date from the early 18th century. It so happens that these precede the earliest-known mentions of the sport in any of Ireland, Scotland or Wales occurring much later in the century.

In 1709, cricket was played by William Byrd of Westover on his James River estates in the Colony of Virginia. This is the earliest reference to cricket being played in the New World.

In 1721, British sailors of the East India Company were reported to be playing cricket at Cambay, near Baroda, and this is the earliest reference to cricket being played in the Indian sub-continent. One of the players wrote: "When my boat was lying for a fortnight in one of the channels, though the country was inhabited by the Culeys, we every day diverted ourselves with playing Cricket and to other Exercises, which they would come and be spectators of".

While Britain's seafaring and trading concerns ensured the spread of cricket overseas, at home it relied heavily on ease of transport and communications, most of these being waterborne as long journeys tended to be undertaken using coastal or river vessels. Road transport was slowly improving and, in 1707, Parliament established the first turnpike trusts that placed a length of road under the control of trustees drawn from local landowners and traders. The turnpike trusts borrowed capital for road maintenance against the security of tolls. This arrangement became the common method of road maintenance for the next 140 years until the railway network became widespread.

See also
 English cricket matches to 1725
 History of cricket (1726–1771)
 List of earliest references in English cricket
 List of English cricketers to 1771
 List of historically significant English cricket teams

Notes and citations

Select bibliography
 
 
 
 
 
 
 
 
 
 
 
 
 
 

 1550
 1550
1550
1550